Alberto Soro Álvarez (born 9 March 1999) is a Spanish footballer who plays for Granada CF as an attacking midfielder.

Club career
Soro was born in Ejea de los Caballeros, Zaragoza, Aragon, and joined Real Zaragoza's youth setup in 2009, from SD Ejea. He made his senior debut with the reserves on 14 May 2017, coming on as a second-half substitute in a 3–0 Tercera División home win against AD CF Épila.

Soro made his professional debut with on 25 August 2018, replacing Diogo Verdasca in a 0–0 home draw against Real Zaragoza in the Segunda División championship. He scored his first professional goal on 8 September, netting the last in a 4–0 away routing of Real Oviedo.

On 5 October 2018, Soro renewed his contract until 2022 and was definitely promoted to the main squad. He ended his first campaign with two goals in 29 appearances, as his side avoided relegation.

On 26 July 2019, Soro signed for Real Madrid until 2024, being immediately loaned back to Zaragoza for the season. He was a regular starter during his spell, contributing with four goals in 39 matches overall as his side narrowly missed out promotion in the play-offs.

On 1 September 2020, Soro signed a five-year contract with La Liga side Granada CF.

Career statistics

Club

References

External links

1998 births
Living people
People from Cinco Villas, Aragon
Sportspeople from the Province of Zaragoza
Spanish footballers
Footballers from Aragon
Association football midfielders
La Liga players
Segunda División players
Segunda División B players
Tercera División players
Real Zaragoza B players
Real Zaragoza players
Real Madrid CF players
Granada CF footballers
Spain youth international footballers